Sainte-Croix-en-Jarez is a commune in the Loire department in central France.

Population

See also
Communes of the Loire department

References

External links
Official Web site

Communes of Loire (department)
Plus Beaux Villages de France